Carinapex papillosa is a species of sea snail, a marine gastropod mollusk in the family Horaiclavidae.

It was previously included within the family Turridae.

Description
The length of the shell varies between 3.5 mm and 6 mm.

(Original description) The small, solid shell has an elongate-oblong shape. The spire is moderately elevated, yellowish-white. It contains 8 convex whorls, constricted beneath the suture and spirally granulose. The granules are rather large, three rows on the whorls of the spire, the lower one obsolete. The base is contracted, spirally ridged and produced into a short, obtuse, open siphonal canal. The aperture is sub-ovate, small, nearly a third the length of the shell. The posterior sinus is large, deep, and rounded. The peristome is rather acute, slightly sinuous near the base. The columella is smooth, callous andnearly vertical.

Distribution
This marine species occurs off Hawaii and the Fiji Islands.

References

External links
 
  Tucker, J.K. 2004 Catalog of recent and fossil turrids (Mollusca: Gastropoda). Zootaxa 682:1–1295.

papillosa